Dvorishchi is a rural locality (a village) in Filippovskoye Rural Settlement, Kirzhachsky District, Vladimir Oblast, Russia. The population was 74 as of 2010.

Geography 
Dvorishchi is located on the Sherna River, 26 km southwest of Kirzhach (the district's administrative centre) by road. Filippovskoye is the nearest rural locality.

References 

Rural localities in Kirzhachsky District